Derevenka is a rural locality (a village) in Kubenskoye Rural Settlement, Kharovsky District, Vologda Oblast, Russia. The population was 13 as of 2002.

Geography 
Derevenka is located 29 km west of Kharovsk (the district's administrative centre) by road. Afonikha is the nearest rural locality.

References 

Rural localities in Kharovsky District